The Dallas North Tollway (DNT, or simply the Tollway) is a  controlled-access toll road operated by the North Texas Tollway Authority (NTTA), which runs from Interstate 35E near downtown Dallas, Texas (USA), to U.S. Highway 380, in Frisco, Texas.

The Dallas North Tollway was the first toll road in the United States to implement electronic toll collection technology, with the introduction of the TollTag in 1989. TollTag users were originally charged $0.05 extra per transaction, but by 1999, the agency moved to the active encouragement of TollTag use by giving tag users a discount off the cash toll rate. In August 2007, the NTTA announced plans to phase out staffed toll booths entirely by May 2010.
The Tollway was converted to all-electronic toll collection on December 11, 2010.

North of I-635, the Dallas North Tollway is accompanied by frontage roads, which are designated as Dallas Parkway for address purposes. This is attributed to when Dallas Parkway was a major thoroughfare before being converted to the current Tollway configuration.

History
The Texas Legislature created the Turnpike Act on June 9, 1953, thereby creating the Texas Turnpike Authority.  The Texas Turnpike Authority began issuing bonds in 1955 for its second project, the first 30 mile section of the Dallas North Tollway.  The original cost was $33,650,000 and started in 1966 and completed from Interstate 35E near downtown Dallas north to Royal Lane in 1968, and soon after to Interstate 635.

Toll controversy 
J.H. "Jack" Davis, Engineer-Manager for the Texas Turnpike Authority, stated in 1968 that "When revenue bonds for a project are finally paid off, however, the facility reverts to the state as part of its highway system, to be used free."  This was supposed to happen the same way the Texas Turnpike Authority turned over the Dallas–Fort Worth Turnpike to the Highway Department in 1977 to become I-30, which then became toll free.  However, the Dallas North Tollway never became toll free and has never been turned over to the Highway Department.  The North Texas Tollway Authority's web site states that "it was no longer a statewide practice to remove tolls from roadways due to a lack of state funding to maintain the roadways".  While it may have been Jack Davis' unofficial intent, it was not law.  The last bond payment was made January 1, 2005.

The Texas Legislature created the North Texas Tollway Authority in June 1997, replacing the Texas Turnpike Authority on September 1, 1997.  The Regional Tollway Authority Act, Chapter 366 of the Texas Transportation Code, is what authorizes the North Texas Tollway Authority, thereby making it a political subdivision of the State of Texas and the operator of the North Dallas Tollway. The initial segment of the tollway ran from Interstate 35E to Royal Lane along an old St. Louis Southwestern Railway corridor. The right-of-way is generally  along this segment, one of the narrowest controlled-access roads in Texas. The segment was completed in June 1968 and toll was originally 20 cents. The tollway was later extended to Briargrove Lane in 1987, to Headquarters Drive in 1994, to S.H. 121 and Gaylord Parkway in 2004, and to US 380 in 2007. The extensions generally parallel S.H. 289, also known as Preston Road. The "DNT Extension Phase 3," which runs from State Highway 121 to U.S. Highway 380, opened in mid-2007.

Current tolls vary from $0.40 to $2.15 for a car with it being more expensive closer to downtown; the lone exception is the Eldorado Pkwy. toll plaza in Frisco. The Tolltag offers a discount on these rates (tolls are $0.30 to $1.41) but requires a prepayment of $40 for up to three transponders, and after that, TollTag accounts can be reloaded at a minimum of $10. Rates increased in September 2009 and will increase every two years. All toll plazas are now equipped for electronic toll collection and main lane plazas feature TollTag express lanes.

Route description

The Dallas North Tollway begins at an interchange with I-35E and Harry Hines Boulevard in the Victory Park and Market Center areas of Dallas. Southbound traffic from the Tollway going onto I-35E must first get on the access road before entering onto the main freeway. At Wycliff Avenue in Oak Lawn the Tollway has its first toll plaza. The Tollway has its first northbound exit at Lemmon Avenue before entering into Highland Park. The city streets of Eastern Avenue and Roland Avenue run alongside the Tollway on the southbound and northbound sides respectively. Due to passing through a heavily populated area, high noise cancelling walls line the Tollway with numerous signs warning drivers about limited sight distance. At the Mockingbird Lane interchange, the Dallas North Tollway briefly enters into University Park before returning to Dallas. Between Loop 12 and Northaven Road, the Tollway runs about a 1/4 mile west of SH 289 (Preston Road).The Tollway interchanges with I-635 (LBJ Freeway) near the Galleria Dallas and runs along the eastern edge of Farmers Branch and enters into Addison. At the Dallas-Collin county line, the Tollway enters into extreme North Dallas and has an interchange with the President George Bush Turnpike and enters the city of Plano. The Dallas North Tollway runs by many shopping centers and housing developments. Going through northern Plano, the Tollway passes by the corporate headquarters of Pizza Hut. The Tollway interchanges with SH 121/Sam Rayburn Tollway and enters into Frisco, passing by the Dr Pepper Ballpark. Development along the Tollway begins to thin before it picks up again near Main Street, passing by Toyota Stadium. Development thins again before the Tollway runs through rural areas of north Frisco. The Dallas North Tollway ends at an interchange with US 380, with Dallas Parkway continuing north as a county road.

Future
At the Tollway's southern end, near downtown, the agency has rebuilt the road around the main toll plaza and added ramps at Oak Lawn Avenue. This project, started in 2006, ended in late fall 2008. On the southern sector of the tollway, the agency plans to spend about US$43 million to add an entrance and exit at Oak Lawn and rebuild most of the tollway surface from the Interstate 35E ramps to Lemmon Avenue. The tollway authority has completely rebuilt the aging toll plaza, adding a third TollTag express lane in each direction. This work coincides with major projects by the city of Dallas to rebuild part of Oak Lawn under the tollway, and by Dallas Area Rapid Transit (DART) to build a rail line along nearby Harry Hines Boulevard.

The North Texas Tollway Authority started work in January 2006 at seven north Dallas locations to improve ramps and add merging lanes. The project cost US$14 million. Northbound projects included adding acceleration or auxiliary lanes between Keller Springs and Trinity Mills roads and between Alpha and Spring Valley roads. Southbound projects include adding outside lane pavement at the President George Bush Turnpike exit; between the Bush Turnpike entrance ramp and Frankford Road; between the Frankford entrance ramp and Sojourn Drive; around the Keller Springs exit at the main lane toll plaza; and between the Keller Springs toll plaza and Spring Valley. The projects would noticeably lengthen many shorter merging lanes, including one at Trinity Mills where vehicles must merge quickly after driving around a curve.

Having completed the third extension north, NTTA plans to further extend Dallas Parkway from US 380 to the Grayson County line. It is planned to be a  extension.  A two-lane county road was upgraded from US 380 to Farm to Market Road 428 in Celina and is currently open to traffic.  North of FM 428, a route has been established, but construction is far from complete. The tollway would end at US 82 if they finish the Gunter Plan. By the mid-2030s it will be launched to US 82. This will be a $1.2 billion project, ready to be built. Work on the tollway began near US 380 in 2017. On February 27, 2020, the proposed section from the Denton/Collin/Grayson County Line to Farm to Market Road 121 was designated as FM 121 Spur. In early 2020, the section of Dallas Parkway north of US 380 expanded to two lanes in either direction, separated by a large median where the future Dallas North Tollway extension will sit.

Exit list
Due to the continuous frontage road system north of I-635, those exits serve more than one roadway. This table lists the combined destinations as they would be viewed when traveling in the northbound direction, though southbound exits will occasionally be grouped in a different way. NTTA does not provide mile reference markers or exit numbers. However, reference markers are provided at  intervals along the major corridors. These markers are installed on the top of the concrete traffic barrier along the DNT corridor. The reference marker corresponds to the station of the alignment in the construction plans.

References 

North Texas Tollway Authority - About Our Roadways

External links 

North Texas Tollway Authority

Toll roads in Texas
Transportation in Dallas County, Texas
Transportation in Collin County, Texas
Transportation in Denton County, Texas
Transportation in Grayson County, Texas